Miroku may refer to:

 Japanese for "Maitreya Buddha": as prophesied by the Buddha before entering nirvana.
 Miroku, the character in the anime and manga series InuYasha.
 Miroku Corp., a gun manufacturer.
 Miroku, a character in Naruto: Shippūden the Movie.
 Miroku, a minor character in 07-Ghost.